Atzeni is a Sardinian surname. Notable people with the surname include:

Alessandro Atzeni (born 1980), retired Italian footballer
Andrea Atzeni (born 1991), professional Italian jockey based in England
Giovanni Atzeni (born 1985, known as "Tittia"), Italian Palio jockey
Sergio Atzeni (1952–1995, Italian writer

See also
Sardinian surnames